"To Die a Virgin" is a song by the Divine Comedy and is the opening track to their 2006 album Victory for the Comic Muse. It was released on 14 August 2006 as the second single from that album. The sample at the beginning of the song is of Jennifer Ehle and Toby Stephens in the 1992 TV series The Camomile Lawn.

Track listings
7" R6712
"To Die a Virgin"
"Long Slow Suicide"

CD single CDR6712
"To Die a Virgin"
"Pamplemousse"

Maxi-CD CDRS6712
"To Die a Virgin"
"Absolute Power"
"Our Mutual Friend" (home demo)

External links
The Divine Comedy - official website

2006 singles
The Divine Comedy (band) songs
Songs written by Neil Hannon
2006 songs
Parlophone singles